Beyer is an unincorporated community in Indiana County, Pennsylvania, United States. Beyer has a post office with ZIP code 16211, which opened on May 13, 1918.

Notes

Unincorporated communities in Indiana County, Pennsylvania
Unincorporated communities in Pennsylvania